Battle Masters is a board game by Milton Bradley made in collaboration with Games Workshop in 1992. It is a game that simulates the type of battles as seen in Warhammer Fantasy Battle, but with much simpler game mechanics not based on its parent game. The game, like its sibling Milton Bradley/Games Workshop partnerships HeroQuest and Space Crusade, was designed by Stephen Baker, who later went on to design the popular game Heroscape.

In Germany it is called Die Claymore-Saga, in France Seigneurs de guerre and in the Netherlands Ridderstrijd.

Gameplay

Battle Masters focuses on a battle between the forces of good, or The Empire, against the forces of evil, or Chaos, which is a combined army including forces from the Chaos and Orcs and Goblins armies of the Warhammer Fantasy setting including creatures such as Ogres.

The game is played on a large vinyl mat which is painted to look like a battle field with large, almost 8 inch, hexes superimposed on it. A large number of unpainted plastic miniatures included in the game are similar in size and style to the Warhammer miniatures produced by Games Workshop. However, instead of individual bases they are designed to be mounted on unit bases of five infantry or three cavalry miniatures.

The game play goes through a series of turns by drawing cards. When a card is drawn the unit or units whose picture(s) is on the card is allowed to first move and then attack (with the exception of archers, crossbowmen and the mighty cannon, who may move or attack). In some instances the card may show multiple units in which case all of those units may move and attack. Two special units exist with unique movement/attack rules, the Ogre Champion (Chaos) and the Mighty Cannon (Empire). They are also mounted as individuals on the unit bases.

Forces

Chaos

The Champions of Chaos (1 unit) unit is the Chaos general, Gorefist, himself. It is the main cavalry of the Chaos forces. It has the highest dice rating and its special card is a Charge, in which it can roll one extra die.

The other mounted forces of Chaos are Wolf Riders (2 units). The player gets two wolf rider units. They are extremely weak in combat, but can move quickly. They are most commonly pictured unit in the Chaos cards, and their special cards lets them move two spaces instead of one.

When an Ogre Champion (1 unit) card is played, the six ogre cards (three depicting ogre moves and three depicting ogre attacks) are shuffled and drawn one at a time. The ogre must then move in the order of the cards (i.e. if the cards are in the order moves, moves, attacks, moves, attacks, attacks) then the ogre champion must move and attack in that order, but can always choose not to take the action. For every wound the ogre takes, it draws one less card. The ogre champion has 6 hit points, while all other units have only 3.

 Chaos Archers (2 units) are the only ranged units in the Chaos army. They can only attack or move and they are unaffected by ditches.
 Chaos Warriors (2 units) are powerful infantry for the Chaos army. They can roll four combat dice, whereas most infantry can attack with only three.
 Orcs (2 units) are standard infantry for the Chaos army. They roll three dice in combat.
 Beastmen (2 units) are standard infantry for the Chaos army, they are identical to orcs in all but the model used.
 Goblins (2 units) are weak infantry for the Chaos army. They roll two dice in combat.

Imperial Army

The Lord Knights  unit is the equivalent to the Champions of Chaos. They have five attack dice, plus they their own Charge card, and one that they share with the Imperial Knights, they make up 1 unit of the imperial army.

The second group of mounted units is the Imperial Knights, though they are not quite as powerful as the attack with 4 dice.  They also have a special charge card that allows them an extra attack, they make up 3 units of the imperial army.

Men-at-Arms are the rank and file infantry of the Imperial Army, they roll 3 dice in combat and make up 3 units of the army.

Imperial Crossbowmen are a unit type unique to the Imperial Army. They function the same as archers, as they can only move or attack. However, their range is three spaces instead of two, they make up one unit of the imperial army.

Imperial Archers can either move or attack but not both like other units. They are unaffected by ditches and have a range of two spaces, they make up two units of the imperial army.

The Mighty Cannon also moves and attacks differently than other units. The player who is the empire selects a target (the closer the better) and places the pieces at random between the cannon and the selected target. The cannon tiles are then flipped over if it shows a cannonball flying, move to the next unit, if it shows a cannonball bouncing the unit on that square takes one skull token (the wound system for the game) and continues to the next tile. If it shows an explosion the unit is destroyed and the cannon's turn has ended. In the event that an explosion happens right next to the cannon it is a misfire; another cannon tile must be placed on the cannon and its effect applied, it makes up one unit of the imperial army.

Terrain

There are several obstacles and markers the players can add to the board to change the layout of the battlefield.  Tiles that can be included are marshes, ditches, hedges and extra river fords.  
The river fords add additional spaces where troops can successfully cross the river.  
The plastic hedges are placed between adjacent spaces, and prevent movement across them.  
The marsh tile may not be moved onto by troops.
The ditch tile may not be moved across the direction of the palisade, however may be entered from the open sides.
The tower can also be added on most game spaces.  Any non-mounted troops can enter the tower, granting an extra dice roll while attacking or defending from the tower.

Expansions

Two expansion packs were released for the game Imperial Lords & Chaos Warband which were meant to be used as reinforcements, however no new playing cards were introduced meaning these were moved using existing cards, the extra units were:

Imperial Lords

 1 unit of Imperial Lords*
 1 unit of Imperial Knights
 1 unit of Men-At-Arms
 2 units of Archers
 1 unit of Crossbow men
 1 extra mighty cannon unit

Chaos Warband

 2 units of Chaos Lords*
 4 units of Beastmen
 2 extra Ogre units

The *Imperial Lords and *Chaos Lords are new units although they're the same as the Lord Knights and Champions of Chaos units, respectively, except that they take only one hit to kill instead of three. The game also introduced a points system, which was designed to calculate a winner if the game needed to be finished early, somewhat similar to chess. The points for each kill given to the opposing team were:

Imperial Army

 Mighty Cannon 10pts
 Lord Knights 9pts
 Imperial Lords 8pts
 Imperial Knights 8pts
 Archers 6pts
 Crossbows 5pts
 Men-At-Arms 4pts

Chaos Army

 Champions of Chaos 9pts
 Chaos Lords 8pts
 Ogre 8pts
 Wolf Riders 5pts
 Chaos Warriors 5pts
 Orc 5pts
 Beastmen 4pts
 Goblin 4pts
 Archers 4pts

Reception
In the December 1992 edition of Dragon (Issue 188), Rick Swan was initially impressed by the contents of the game box: "The dozens of plastic pieces, detailed down to the bolts on the war hammers and scowls on the goblins, are a miniaturist’s dream. The enormous vinyl battle map, with nearly 25 square feet of green fields and azure rivers, may be the biggest playing area ever included in a board game. Throw in a 5” plastic castle, a handful of skull dice, and enough odds and ends to bury the family dog, and it’s like a visit from Santa Claus." But Swan was disappointed with every other aspect of the game. He felt the rules were overly simplistic, "as if the designers were afraid that excessive decision-making might cause the players’ heads to explode." And despite all of the different playing pieces, Swan noted that "there’s no meaningful difference between the various units, as just about all of them move and attack the same way." Despite its issues, he pointed out that when he play-tested it with grade-school kids, "everyone one of them adored ... a game big enough to fill the living-room floor." For this reason, Swan raised his rating of the game from poor to an average rating of 3.5 stars out of 6.

In the November–December 1992 edition of Casus Belli (Issue #72), the reviewer noted the large game box packed with colourful, high-quality components, commenting, "Milton Bradley always pushes the limits of the quantity of material present in its games." However, the reviewer found that the rules were far too over-simplified for adults, "but it is true that this is a board game aimed at a fairly young audience. " The reviewer concluded, "Before we mourn the fate of poor buyers who were dazzled by the profusion and quality of the material [...] the option exists to upgrade the rules system at your convenience."

Other reviews
Challenge #74 (1994)

References

External links
 
 Official Battle Masters Manual

Board games introduced in 1992
Fantasy board wargames
Games Workshop games
Milton Bradley Company games
Miniature wargames
Warhammer Fantasy